Kape or KAPE may refer to:

KAPE, a radio station (1550 AM) in Cape Girardeau, Missouri, United States
Kape Alamid, coffee made from berries which have passed through the digestive tract of the Asian Palm Civet
Kape Barako, a coffee grown in the Philippines

See also
Kapes, a Queen consort of Egypt, wife of Pharaoh Takelot I
Kapes (genus), an extinct genus of parareptile
Cape (disambiguation)